The 2018 League of Ireland Cup, known for sponsorship reasons as the 2018 EA Sports Cup, was the 45th season of the League of Ireland's secondary knockout competition. The EA Sports Cup features teams from the SSE Airtricity League Premier and First Divisions, as well as some intermediate level teams. Derry City won the cup for a record 11th time.

Teams

Clubs denoted with * received a bye into Second round

First round

All teams were divided into four pools based on geographical location. Two random teams per pool received a bye into the second round. The draw for the first round took place on 9 February 2018. Ties were scheduled to begin on 5 March 2018 but were subsequently postponed due to the aftermath of extreme weather from a cold wave known as the Beast from the East combined with Storm Emma. Rescheduled ties were set for various dates across March and April 2018.

Second round
The draw for the Second round took place on 22 March 2018 and was made on a regional pool basis. Ties were scheduled for Easter Monday 2 April 2018. Four second round fixtures were postponed due to heavy rainfall causing unplayable pitches. Rearranged fixtures were set for 9 April, 23 April and 24 April.

Quarter-finals
The draw for the quarter finals took place on 10 April 2018 and was an open draw, unlike previous rounds which were drawn on a geographic pooled basis. Ties are due to be played on 7/8 May 2018.

Semi-finals

The draw for the semi finals of the 2018 EA Sports Cup was made on 13 May 2018. Both ties were played on 6 August 2018.

Final

The final of the League of Ireland Cup took place on 16 September 2018. Home advantage was decided by a coin toss, which Derry City won.

References
  EA Sports Cup first round draw courtesy of  sseairtricityleague.ie
  First round draw postponements courtesy of  extratime.ie
  EA Sports Cup second round draw courtesy of  extratime.ie
  Second round postponements courtesy of irishmirror.ie
  Quarter-final draw courtesy of  sseairtricityleague.ie
  Semi-final draw courtesy of  fai.ie

Cup
3
League of Ireland Cup seasons